Kenya has competed at every edition of the IAAF World Championships in Athletics since its inception in 1983. It has won the second highest number of gold medals at the championships (after the United States) and also has the second highest medals total (after the U.S.).

The vast majority of its medals have come in middle- and long-distance running events, mostly on the men's side. It ranks fourth on all-time placing tables at the competition, reflecting its narrow event focus. The nation typically sends medium-sized delegations of 40–50 athletes. Kenya ranked number one on gold medals at the 2015 World Championships in Athletics and has finished in the top five nations on the medal table at all but five editions.

The country's most successful athlete at the competition is Ezekiel Kemboi, who has won four gold medals and three silver medals in the men's 3000 metres steeplechase. Kenya's most successful woman, Vivian Cheruiyot, has also won four gold medals and also a silver in the 5000 metres and 10,000 metres events. Men's steeplechaser Moses Kiptanui won three straight titles from 1991 to 1995 and Asbel Kiprop achieved the same feat in the 1500 metres from 2011 to 2015. Julius Yego is the country's only field event medallist, having won the men's javelin throw in 2015. Kenya's dominance in the steeplechase event is such that a Kenyan-born man has won every title since 1991.

Former Kenyans have also had impacts for other nations at the championships, including 2007's double champion Bernard Lagat (United States), two-time steeplechase champion Saif Saaeed Shaheen (Qatar) and marathon winner Rose Chelimo (Bahrain).

Medal table

Medalists

Doping
Compared to other successful nations, such as the United States and Russia, Kenya's athletes have been largely unaffected by doping failures at the competition. The nation's first failures at the championships occurred in 2015, neither of whom were finalists.

References 

IAAF Statistics Book – IAAF World Championships London 2017
Kenya at the 2017 World Championships in Athletics

 
Kenya
World Championships in Athletics